The St. Teodora de la Sihla Church is a cathedral in Central Chișinău, Moldova.

Overview 

Formerly the chapel of a girls gymnasium, the church of St. Teodora de la Sihla is an architectural masterpiece by Alexander Bernardazzi. It boasts the elements of his favorite neoclassic byzantine architecture.

Gallery

See also 
 Metropolis of Bessarabia

External links 

 Puşkin, 20 A, Sf. Cuvioasa Teodora de la Sihla
 Biserica Sfânta Teodora de la Sihla, Chişinău 

Churches completed in 1895
19th-century Eastern Orthodox church buildings
Religious buildings and structures in Moldova
Churches in Moldova
Metropolis of Bessarabia